Mystic Dunes Resort & Golf Club (formerly known as Wyndham Palms) resides on over  of rolling hills, Florida nature preserves, and tropical landscaping in Celebration, Florida.  It is located on one of the highest elevations in the area, roughly two miles from the Walt Disney World Resort in Orlando, Florida. The star feature of the resort is the Mystic Dunes Golf Club, which is the namesake of the resort, and comprises roughly 33% of the property.

Amenities
The resort includes an 18 hole golf course (not complementary), an 18 hole miniature-golf course, pools, a video game arcade (not complementary), bicycle checkout, and on-site dining (not complementary). The resort also features a comedy magic show on Wednesday nights, tickets for the show can be purchased in the clubhouse or in the resort lobby. The show is also opened to outside guests not staying onsite. The available dining includes the Kenzie's restaurant at the clubhouse, the snack bar at the main pool, a snack trolley that tours the golf course, and Maui Pizza Express delivery to the suites.

Available Accommodations
The resort has timeshare villas ranging in size from 1 bedroom up to 3 bedrooms, and has both 2 and 3 bedroom models that include the lockoff feature.

 KB = King Bed
 QB = Queen Bed
 QSS = Queen Sleeper Sofa

Timeshare Sales
As with most timeshare resorts in the U.S., this resort relies on incentivized Time Share Tours to generate sales. At this resort, the sales cycle follows this pattern:
 The customer is solicited to attend a tour for an incentive.
 The customer comes at the designated time and signs in at the tour desk in the sales center
 The customer is greeted in the lobby of the sales center by their "Vacation Consultant" (salesperson)
 The salesperson explains timeshare and its benefits while asking questions that identify the needs of the customer. (The goal here is to get the customer to agree that timeshare is a good idea based on their needs, and some salespeople will just keep going until they can get the customer to agree.)
 The salesperson takes the customer out on a physical tour of the property and the model suite. (The goal while on the property tour is to eliminate all objections other than money, so that negotiations can begin upon return to the sales center.)
 The salesperson then takes the customer back to the sales center and shows them how the financing would look on the unit of their preference.
 If the customer declines this initial offer, a sales manager will be brought to the table:
 If the customer has no interest, the manager's goal is to ensure that the tour went OK, and that there were no problems other than the money.  They will often attempt to offer a special deal from their special (upgrade-exchange or pre-construction) inventory to determine if price would make a difference.
 If the customer is interested, the manager's goal is to find a unit from his special inventory that will work for them financially.  If the customer knows with certainty what they can spend monthly or which unit they want, then the manager can often quickly get to the bottom line.
 If no sale occurs, then a "Representative of the Developer" (a leaser) is brought over to see if the customer might be interested in looking at the opportunity again in the future.  If so, they offer a low cost lease opportunity.  If not, they show the customer to the gift center.
 The customer reports to the gift center, and exchanges their tour worksheet for their incentive/promotional gift.

References

External links
 Mystic Dunes Resort & Golf Club

Celebration, Florida
Resorts in Florida
Timeshare